Janak Prakash (born 16 August 2000) is a player for the Singapore national cricket team. Janak is an all-rounder. He also played for the Singapore U'19s at age of 16 in Sri Lanka. In October 2018, he was named in Singapore's squad in the Eastern sub-region group for the 2018–19 ICC World Twenty20 Asia Qualifier tournament. Later the same month, he was named in Singapore's squad for the 2018 ICC World Cricket League Division Three tournament in Oman.

In July 2019, he was named in Singapore's Twenty20 International (T20I) squad for the Regional Finals of the 2018–19 ICC T20 World Cup Asia Qualifier tournament. He made his T20I debut for Singapore against Qatar on 22 July 2019.

In September 2019, he was named in Singapore's squad for the 2019 Malaysia Cricket World Cup Challenge League A tournament. In October 2019, he was named in Singapore's squad for the 2019 ICC T20 World Cup Qualifier tournament in the United Arab Emirates.

He made his List A debut on 27 October 2021, for Ace Capital Cricket Club in the 2021–22 Major Clubs Limited Over Tournament in Sri Lanka.

References

External links
 http://www.espncricinfo.com/ci/content/player/973799.html

2000 births
Living people
Singaporean cricketers
Singapore Twenty20 International cricketers
Southeast Asian Games gold medalists for Singapore
Southeast Asian Games silver medalists for Singapore
Southeast Asian Games medalists in cricket
Competitors at the 2017 Southeast Asian Games
Singaporean sportspeople of Indian descent